The 1956 Lady Wigram Trophy was a motor race held at the Wigram Airfield Circuit on 21 January 1956. It was the fifth Lady Wigram Trophy to be held and was won by Peter Whitehead in the Ferrari 500/750S. This was Whitehead's second Lady Wigram Trophy victory in succession and was another international podium lockout with Tony Gaze once again finishing second and Leslie Marr finishing third.

Classification

References

Lady Wigram Trophy
Lady
January 1956 sports events in New Zealand